is a railway station on the Rikuu West Line in Shōnai, Yamagata, Japan, operated by East Japan Railway Company (JR East).

Lines
Karikawa Station is served by the Rikuu West Line, and is located 34.9 rail kilometers from the terminus of the line at Shinjō Station.

Station layout
The station has one island platform of which only one side is in use, serving a bidirectional single track. It is connected to the station building by a level crossing. The station is staffed.

History
Karikawa Station opened on August 16, 1914. The station was absorbed into the JR East network upon the privatization of JNR on April 1, 1987.

Passenger statistics
In fiscal 2018, the station was used by an average of 65 passengers daily (boarding passengers only).

Surrounding area
Karikawa Post Office
Site of Karikawa Castle

See also
List of railway stations in Japan

References

External links

 JR East Station information 

Stations of East Japan Railway Company
Railway stations in Yamagata Prefecture
Rikuu West Line
Railway stations in Japan opened in 1914
Shōnai, Yamagata